Dysommina is a genus of eels in the cutthroat eel family Synaphobranchidae. It currently contains the following species:

 Dysommina proboscideus (E. H. M. Lea, 1913)
 Dysommina rugosa Ginsburg, 1951
 Dysommina orientalis Tighe et al., 2018

In 2005 there was discovered Eel City - an unusual community of Dysommina rugosa on the summit of Vailulu'u submarine volcano.

References

 

Synaphobranchidae